Devonport Golf Club is an 18 hole championship golf course located at the Woodrising Golf Course, Woodrising Avenue, Spreyton, Tasmania. It is 5 minutes drive from the city of Devonport.

Woodrising’ offers the golfer with a challenging, tree-lined, well bunkered course that has excellent greens. The course sits on a peninsula of land leading into the Mersey River and has a fairly flat appearance with gently rolling fairways.

It is in the top ten golf courses in Tasmania.

Mike Harwood claimed his fourth Tasmanian Senior Open Title in February, 2015, other titles were won in 2009, 2010 and 2012.

References 

1921 establishments in Australia
Sports clubs established in 1921
Sports venues completed in 1921
Sports venues in Devonport, Tasmania
Golf clubs and courses in Tasmania